Beilschmiedia roxburghiana is the type species of the tree genus Beilschmiedia in the family Lauraceae. Its native range is from the Himalayas to S. China, Indo-China to Peninsula Malaysia; in Vietnam it may be called chắp chại or bạch mi; no subspecies are listed in the Catalogue of Life.

References 

Flora of Indo-China
Flora of Malesia
roxburghiana